The Barnes Ice Cap is an ice cap located in central Baffin Island, Nunavut, Canada.

Geography
It has been thinning due to regional warming.

The ice cap contains Canada's oldest ice, some of it being over 20,000 years old. It is a remnant of the Laurentide Ice Sheet, which covered much of Canada during the last glacial period of the Earth's current ice age. Generator Lake is located at the southeastern end of the ice cap.

See also
List of glaciers

References

Bodies of ice of Baffin Island
Arctic Cordillera
Ice caps of Canada